Roberto Torres may refer to:
Roberto Torres (musician) (born 1940), Cuban musician
Roberto Torres (cyclist) (born 1964), Spanish former cyclist
Roberto Torres (footballer, born 1972), Paraguayan football manager and former footballer
Roberto Torres (footballer, born 1989), Spanish footballer
Roberto Torres (author, born 1979), Puerto Rican author

See also
Robert Torres, American secretary
Roberto Marrufo Torres (born 1949), Mexican politician